The 1996 British Grand Prix was a Formula One motor race held on 14 July 1996 at Silverstone. It was the tenth race of the 1996 FIA Formula One World Championship.

Williams' Jacques Villeneuve took his second win of the season from Benetton's Gerhard Berger, with McLaren's Mika Häkkinen coming home third for his first podium since his near-fatal crash at 1995 Australian Grand Prix. Jordan's Rubens Barrichello took fourth, equalling his best finish of the season, and it came after he had been involved in late collisions while racing for fourth place at the circuit in the previous two years. The final points went to David Coulthard in the second McLaren and Martin Brundle in the second Jordan.

Damon Hill took pole position for his home race, but made a slow start and retired shortly before half distance, after a wheel nut problem caused him to spin off at Copse Corner while he was trying to pass Häkkinen. For the third consecutive race, Ferrari drivers Michael Schumacher and Eddie Irvine were both forced to retire with technical issues in the first six laps – Schumacher with hydraulic problems and Irvine with a differential failure. Jean Alesi would become another notable retirement on lap 45 from 3rd place, just ahead of teammate Gerhard Berger when his rear brakes overheated.

Classification

Qualifying 

 Rosset was excluded after missing an FIA weight-check. He was allowed to start at the back of the grid.

Race

Notes 
 Last race: Forti
 Last race: Andrea Montermini
 Ricardo Rosset's qualifying times (best 1:30.529) were scratched after he missed the FIA weight check, dropping him from 17th to 20th on the grid.

Championship standings after the race 

Drivers' Championship standings

Constructors' Championship standings

References 

British Grand Prix
Grand Prix
British Grand Prix
British Grand Prix